David Cochrane is a Canadian television journalist, who was named the host of CBC News Network's daily show Power & Politics in February 2023.

Previously a reporter for network affiliate CBNT-DT in St. John's, Newfoundland and Labrador, he won a Canadian Screen Award for Best Local News Reportage at the 2nd Canadian Screen Awards in 2014 for his report on a major police drug smuggling investigation in the province. He joined the network's national parliamentary bureau in Ottawa as a reporter in 2016, and was sometimes seen as a fill-in host of Power & Politics prior to being named the show's permanent host in 2023.

References

1973 births
Canadian television news anchors
Canadian television reporters and correspondents
CBC Television people
Canadian Screen Award winning journalists
Journalists from Newfoundland and Labrador
People from Mount Pearl
Living people